Private benefits of control is a technical term used by corporate lawyers and economists. It refers to the economic gain from exerting influence on a company by large shareholders at the expense of small shareholders.

Types
There are two different types of private benefits of control from company value perspective: Benefits which reduce the value of company and which do not so. An example was given by Barclay and Holderness, in comparison to benefits that accrue to all shareholders by raising the productivity of the company.

Protection
In order to prevent the impact on the small shareholders from the realization of these benefits of large shareholders, there is usually a mandatory offer policy in transaction area for protection of the small shareholders from kinds of value-destroying transactions.

See also
 Corporate governance
 Control premium
 Mandatory offer

Notes

References
MJ Barclay and CG Holderness, 'Private Benefits of Control in Public Corporations' (1989) 25 Journal of Financial Economics 371

Shareholders